No More Kings are the Los Angeles-based musical collaboration of singer/songwriter Pete Mitchell and producer/songwriter Neil Robins. No More Kings' music is known for its frequent references to figures in pop culture, 
most notably Johnny Lawrence  from The Karate Kid, Michael and K.I.T.T. from Knight Rider, Johnny 5 from Short Circuit, and Dungeons and Dragons. The band's songs are written by Mitchell along with his longtime friend Neil Robins of the Louisville-based band Dirt Poor Robins.

The name "No More Kings" comes from an episode of Schoolhouse Rock!, one of many of No More Kings' inspirations. The particular episode dealt with the Pilgrims leaving England, seeking freedom and independence.

Pete studied fine art in college and has worked for Disney and the Jim Henson Company; he is an accomplished animator and also speaks Japanese. He designed the interior album art for the band's first album as well as the album art and packaging for their second album. Pete claims his main sources of musical inspiration are the Beatles, Michael Jackson, Radiohead, Billy Joel, Beck, and Genesis.

Music videos

Sweep the Leg
No More Kings received much of their exposure from their 2007 music video "Sweep the Leg", which incorporates elements of the 1984 film The Karate Kid and features appearances by nearly the entire original cast. Martin Kove reprises his role as John Kreese, and actors who played the Cobra Kai members in the 1984 film, Ron Thomas (Bobby), Rob Garrison (Tommy), and Tony O'Dell (Jimmy) are also part of the cast. William Zabka, who played Johnny Lawrence in the film, directed the video. Pat E. Johnson, who was the martial arts director for the film as well as the martial arts director for Bruce Lee, worked on this video. Dennis Haskins and Liza Snyder also make an appearance. "Sweep the Leg" was also featured on Sony's MLB 08: The Show.

The premise for the music video finds Zabka and members of his Cobra Kai gang living in a trailer in the desert, having become obsessed with the fight he lost years ago. He is haunted by No More Kings and chases Mitchell across the desert until they have a final showdown at the All Valley Under-18 Karate Championships. Johnny then claims victory, but after realizing it was a fantasy, he is run over by Ralph Macchio as Mitchell looks on.

The music video references not only The Karate Kid, but also the 1986 film Back to School (which also stars Zabka), the 1987 film Raising Arizona, and the 1984 video for The Cars song, "You Might Think."

There are various versions of the video, the longest being a little over seven minutes. The video was a collaboration between No More Kings’ record label Astonish Records, and Chapter Seven Films, a film company in Los Angeles.

"Sweep the Leg" received over 80,000 views within its first week of release and became the number one video on YouTube on March 16, 2007. It was featured on MySpace's most-viewed lists, earned nearly a million views on YouTube, and was mentioned on VH1's "Best Week Ever" online.

In 2008, Astonish Records released a special collector's edition CD/DVD.

Michael

In 2008, No More Kings followed up the video for "Sweep the Leg" with "Michael (Jump In)", which was animated by San Francisco animation company GhostBot. In "Michael (Jump In)", lead singer Pete Mitchell is a hero-wannabe who attempts to help people, but just makes things worse.  The main character in the video is trying to be like Michael, from the show Knight Rider.

History

Origins
Pete Mitchell and Neil DeGraide started No More Kings by themselves in the 1990s, and were later joined by Adam DeGraide (bass). They broke up in the late 1990s, but reformed in 2006 when Adam DeGraide started a record label called Astonish Records and signed them.

Since the band's reformation, musicians are often added and interchanged according to tours and albums. Pete Mitchell is the band's lead singer and occasionally plays the guitar or piano for shows. He writes songs with Neil Robins, who produces their albums and plays a majority of the instruments.

All The Kings Men
All The Kings Men is the publicity street team for the band No More Kings, which helps in bringing friends to the shows, phoning local radio stations to request the band's songs, putting up posters, and posting to band forums or related bulletin boards online. The name was selected out of hundreds of suggestions by street team members, and came from fan Alicia King.

Discography
 No More Kings, released on March 6, 2007.

The band's self-titled debut album has a pop atmosphere and focuses on pop culture and literary references. Knight Rider, The Karate Kid, the Smurfs, Gulliver's Travels, characters from Peanuts, the Beastie Boys, Darth Vader, Fonzie, M.C. Hammer, Archie Bunker, Ghostbusters II, Adam and Eve, and Gene Kelly are all mentioned throughout the album. Well-known songs by the band include "Michael (Jump In)", "Sweep The Leg", and "Zombie Me". Lead singer Pete Mitchell described the album as "a thank-you letter to the 80s".

In early 2008, No More Kings won in The 7th Annual Independent Music Awards for Best Pop Album.

 And the Flying Boombox, released on May 12, 2009.

No More Kings' follow-up album presents quite a different atmosphere, but brings back the pop culture references including Vincent Barbarino from Welcome Back Kotter, MySpace, Dungeons and Dragons, Hollywood Squares, Lewis and Clark, Run-D.M.C., Butch Cassidy and the Sundance Kid, Short Circuit, and Merlin and Arthur from Arthurian Legend. The album produced singles, "Obey the Groove" and "Dance Alone."

III, released on April 9, 2014

III is the latest album produced by the group in 2013. Following the release of several singles, the group published their 3rd album containing all their newer works, plus a new song called "Tracy's Song". This album contained works such as "They're Coming To Get You Barbara" (a reference to the 1968 zombie film Night of the Living Dead), and the "Zombie Me Apocamix" a remix on their popular track from the first album.

Notes

External links
 No More Kings Official Website
  No More Kings at MySpace
 No More Kings YouTube page
 Official "Sweep the Leg" video website
 Pete Mitchell's Interview Show on LiveVideo.com
 
 An interview with Pete Mitchell on Notebook on Cities and Culture

Rock music groups from California
Independent Music Awards winners
American pop rock music groups
Musical groups from Los Angeles
Musical groups established in 2006